Mohamed Simakan (born 3 May 2000) is a French professional footballer who plays as a defender for Bundesliga club RB Leipzig.

Club career

Strasbourg 
On 16 May 2018, Simakan signed his first professional contract with Strasbourg. He made his professional debut in a 3–1 UEFA Europa League win over Maccabi Haifa on 25 July 2019.

RB Leipzig 
On 22 March 2021, Simakan agreed to join German club RB Leipzig on a five-year deal for an undisclosed fee, to be effective in the summer of 2021.

International career
Born in France, Simakan is of Guinean descent.

Thanks to his great performance with Strasbourg in Ligue 1, Simakan was called up by Bernard Diomède to play for France U20 national team. He played his first game as a starter against Slovenia in which he scored a header contributing to his team's 2–2 draw.

Career statistics

Honours
RB Leipzig
DFB-Pokal: 2021–22

References

External links

 Profile at the RB Leipzig website
 
 
 Racing Stub profile
 FFF Profile

2000 births
Living people
Footballers from Marseille
Association football defenders
French footballers
France youth international footballers
French expatriate footballers
French sportspeople of Guinean descent
Olympique de Marseille players
RC Strasbourg Alsace players
RB Leipzig players
Ligue 1 players
Championnat National 3 players
Bundesliga players
Expatriate footballers in Germany
Black French sportspeople